Gaositwe Keagakwa Tibe Chiepe MBE (born 20 October 1922) is a Botswana former politician and diplomat with the Botswana Democratic Party. She was her country's high commissioner to the United Kingdom and Nigeria and ambassador to West Germany, France, Denmark, Norway, Sweden and the European Economic Community. She was Botswana's Minister for Trade and Industry in 1977 and in 1984 she became the Foreign Minister. She then served as the Minister for Education from 1994 to 1999.

Early life
Chiepe was born in what was the Bechuanaland Protectorate (now Botswana) on 20 October 1922, to Moruti Tibe Chiepe and S. T. Chiepe (née Sebina). Her father died in her youth and her extended family wanted her to leave school and get married, Her mother insisted she stayed on at school to continue her education. Chiepe later attributed her successful career to her mother's insistence that she be educated.

Education 
She attended primary school in Serowe and eventually went to Tiger Kloof Educational Institute, South Africa for secondary education, having received a scholarship as the best student in the country.

She then attended Fort Hare University, also in South Africa, where she received a Bachelor of Science as well as a postgraduate Diploma in education.

In 1958, she graduated from the University of Bristol in the UK with a master's degree. Her thesis was entitled "An Investigation of the Problems of Popular Education in the Bechuanaland Protectorate in Light of a Comparative Study of Similar Problems in the Early Stages of English Education and in the Development of Education in Yugoslavia and Uganda.

She was awarded an honorary degree from Depaul University, United States. Chiepe began her career in the Bechuanaland Protectorate Government in the Department of Education and was one of the first two Africans appointed to an administrative position (Education Officer) in the colonial government. Chiepe was the first woman education officer of Botswana.

Political career
Chiepe was the first female cabinet member in Botswana (1974) having become a Specially-Elected Member of Parliament. She was popularly elected to parliament from the Serowe South constituency in the Central District of Botswana in a by-election in 1977.

She was appointed to the post of high commissioner to United Kingdom and Nigeria and ambassador to West Germany, France, Denmark, Norway, Sweden and the European Economic Community  from 1970 to 1974. During her time as High Commissioner in the UK, she chaired the fifth Caroline Haslett Memorial Lecture at the Royal Society of Arts. Run by the Women's Engineering Society, Dr Letitia Obeng, then Director of Freshwater Research Institute of Aquatic Biology in Ghana spoke on 'Nation Building & the African Woman'.

From 1974 to 1977, Chiepe was the Minister of Trade and Industry. From 1977 to 1984, she was the Minister of Mines & Natural Resources. In 1982 Chiepe served as Honorary President of the Kalahari Conservation Society (KCS).

In 1984, Chiepe became the Foreign Minister (Minister of External Affairs), in which position she remained until 1994.

From 1994 to 1999, she was the Minister of Education. Chiepe retired from government life in 1999 after nearly 30 years of high level positions.

In 2013, she was the headline speaker at Botswana's International Day of Older Persons held in the Mokolodi Nature Reserve, saying ““We want to be ‘the aged in counsel and the young in action....Let us, as the elderly not be relegated to being dinosaurs but utilize our knowledge and hard earned wisdom to not only increase our relevance and longevity in society, but also increase the contact between generations, bridging the gap between young and old.”

Recognition 
Chiepe has been awarded both the Presidential Order of Merit and the Presidential Order of Meritorious Service (Botswana), and been made a Commander of the Royal Order of the Polar Star by the King of Sweden and a Member of the Order of the British Empire (MBE).

She has received honorary doctorates from University of Bristol in Britain, De Paul University in United States  and Fort Hare in South Africa. In 2009 she was awarded an honorary Doctorate of Laws by the University of Botswana for her outstanding work in the development of the country.

In October 2022, Chiepe turned 100. In response, the Cabinet of Botswana convened a meeting to honour Chiepe for her lifetime of service to the country.

Publications 
 Thesis (Ph.D.) University of Bristol, 1957. An investigation of the problems of popular education in the Bechuanaland Protectorate : in the light of a comparative study of similar problems in the early stages of English education and in the development of education in Yugoslavia and Uganda.
 Chiepe, G.K.T.. (1973). Development in Botswana. African Affairs. 72. 319–322. 10.1093/oxfordjournals.afraf.a096390.
 Rensburg, Patrick & Chiepe, G. (1996). Education with Production—An Overview [and] The Botswana Brigades, 1965–1995.

See also

List of the first women holders of political offices in Africa

Sources

 Biography on Book Rags

1922 births
Living people
Foreign Ministers of Botswana
Botswana women diplomats
Members of the National Assembly (Botswana)
University of Fort Hare alumni
Alumni of the University of Bristol
Government ministers of Botswana
Women government ministers of Botswana
Botswana Democratic Party politicians
Ambassadors of Botswana to West Germany
Ambassadors of Botswana to France
Ambassadors of Botswana to Denmark
Ambassadors of Botswana to Norway
Ambassadors of Botswana to Sweden
Ambassadors of Botswana to the European Union
Female foreign ministers
High Commissioners of Botswana to the United Kingdom
High Commissioners of Botswana to Nigeria
20th-century women politicians
Women ambassadors
Botswana centenarians
Women centenarians